Félix Potoy (born 15 March 1995) is a Nicaraguan rower. He competed in the 2020 Summer Olympics.

References

1995 births
Living people
Rowers at the 2020 Summer Olympics
Nicaraguan male rowers
Olympic rowers of Nicaragua
Pan American Games competitors for Nicaragua
Rowers at the 2019 Pan American Games